White Solomon Graves III (born March 20, 1942) is a former American football defensive back who played four seasons in the American Football League with the Boston Patriots and Cincinnati Bengals. He was drafted by the Boston Patriots in the 17th round of the 1965 AFL Draft. He played college football at Louisiana State University and attended Crystal Springs High School in Crystal Springs, Mississippi.

College career
Graves played college football for the LSU Tigers. He was named to the Academic All-SEC team in 1964.

Professional career
Graves was selected by the Boston Patriots with the 135th pick in the 1965 AFL Draft. He played in forty games for the Patriots from 1965 to 1967.

He played in two games for the Cincinnati Bengals during the 1968 season.

Personal life
His son, Sol Graves, played quarterback for the LSU Tigers.

References

External links
Just Sports Stats
College stats

1942 births
Living people
Players of American football from Jackson, Mississippi
American football defensive backs
LSU Tigers football players
Boston Patriots players
Cincinnati Bengals players
American Football League players